Olga Yevgenyevna Romanova (born on March 28, 1966, in Lyubertsy, Russia) is a Russian journalist and a director of the civil rights organization Russia Behind Bars.

Biography
Olga Abramovich was born on March 28, 1966, in Lyubertsy, Russia.

In 1988 Romanova graduated from the Moscow College of Finance, the Finance Department.

1988-1991 she was working as a journalist at the news agency "IMA Press".

1991 - 1994 Romanova worked as a Moscow correspondent for the Institutional Investor Magazine.

1994 - 1997 - Economy commentator in the newspaper "[Today]" (Сегодня).

1997 - 1999 - co-author and a host of analytic TV program "In Reality" (На самом деле) on the TV-Center Channel (ТВ Центр). Editor of the program "Big Money" (Большие деньги) on the NTV (НТВ) Channel.

1999 - 2002 - author of a weekly column in the newspaper "Vedomosti" (Ведомости), author and co-owner of a weekly magazine "FAS" (ФАС).

1999 - 2005 - host of the analytic TV program "24 with Olga Romanova" on Ren-TV.
 
Since 2005 - host of "Echonomics" (Эхономика), "Big Watch" (Большой Дозор), and "Special Opinion" (Особое Мнение) on Echo of Moscow.

2007 - 2008 - editor of the Economics department of The New Times.

2007 - 2008 - chief editor of the BusinessWeek magazine.

Since 2007 - Professor at the Faculty of Media Communications, Department of Journalism at the National Research university - Higher School of Economics.

2008 - following the arrest and imprisonment of her husband, Aleksey Kozlov, Romanova published his jail diary in her blog. In 2010 Romanova turned it into a book "Butirka" (Бутырка). The same year Romanova founded a non-profit group  "Russia Behind Bars" (Rus Sidyashaya) that documents the mistreatment of prisoners in Russia.

2009 - 2010 chief editor, contributor to Slon.ru.

In 2017 Romanova fled to Germany after claiming she was falsely accused of embezzling state funds.

References

External links

 

1966 births
Living people
People from Lyubertsy
REN TV
Echo of Moscow radio presenters
2011–2013 Russian protests
Russian dissidents
Women human rights activists
Russian human rights activists
Academic staff of the Higher School of Economics
Financial University under the Government of the Russian Federation alumni
Free Media Awards winners